This is a list of the 1985 PGA Tour Qualifying School graduates. Fifty players earned their 1986 PGA Tour card through Q-School in 1985. The tournament was played over 108 holes at the Grenelefe Golf and Tennis Resort, West and South courses, in Haines City, Florida. The top 50 players split the $100,000 purse, with the winner earning $15,000. Peter McWhinney lost a six-for-five playoff for the last cards.

Burmese golfer Kyi Hla Han was trying to become the second Burmese, after Mya Aye, to make it onto the PGA Tour. However, he was unable to move onto the finals, playing poorly in the final round of his regional qualifying tournament in California.

Sources:

References

PGA Tour Qualifying School
Golf in Florida
PGA Tour Qualifying School
PGA Tour Qualifying School